City of Sanctuary is a charity supporting a network of groups across the UK and Ireland working to build a culture of welcome and hospitality within their communities. Although this welcome spreads to anyone who may need it, this movement mainly looks at the inclusion of asylum seekers and refugees. They celebrate the skills refugees and asylum seekers bring with them and provide a platform for their engagement with their locality and for their voices to be heard. They are a movement built by the grassroots, from the communities who wish to change things where they are, rather than a top down approach.

Story
City of Sanctuary began in the city of Sheffield in Yorkshire in 2005 by Craig Barnett and Inderjit Bhogal. In 2007, with the support of the City Council and over 70 local community organisations, Sheffield became the UK’s first ‘City of Sanctuary’ – "a city that takes pride in the welcome it offers to people in need of safety." With the success of Sheffield, the movement then spread, with cities such as Leeds, Hull and Swansea starting their own groups to try and create an atmosphere where the refugees and asylum seekers living there could feel welcomed. As the movement grew, City of Sanctuary became a registered charity, helping to spread the movement and to connect groups to support one another.
By early 2015 there were around 30 groups across the UK and Ireland, and the organisation had built a Sanctuary Alliance with other notable organisations in the UK sector, such as Refugee Council, British Red Cross, Refugee Action, Student Action for Refugees. They had successfully pulled off an event in parliament, Sanctuary in Parliament, which allowed refugees and asylum seekers to share their stories in the place decisions are made, and to invite their MPs to come and listen and talk to them. They had also been a major part of organising the Sanctuary Summit in 2014, where The Birmingham Declaration was written.

British human rights activist and journalist William Gomes has criticised a local city of sanctuary and the national city of sanctuary movement in his article titled "York City of Sanctuary: its achievements and the seismic shift necessary" 

In September 2015, when the picture of Aylan Kurdi hit the media, City of Sanctuary was overwhelmed with new groups wishing to help in the refugee crisis. The charity was chosen to be included in the 2015 Guardian Christmas Appeal, and over the next few months the movement grew to over 60 groups, although groups were also based in villages and boroughs,

Streams of Sanctuary 
City of Sanctuary has "Streams" of Sanctuary around a particular theme. This happens in schools, Colleges, universities, local authorities, Health, Maternity, Faiths and arts.  Anyone can set up a Stream of Sanctuary to help welcome and  refugees."

Sanctuary Awards 
The Sanctuary Awards recognise and celebrate the organisations who go above and beyond to welcome people seeking sanctuary. Any community group, private organisation, public sector service or other bodies which contribute towards the vision of welcome can apply for the award. They are an opportunity to celebrate and share good practice as well reflect on how things can be improved within a sector.

In 2015 the first "Sports Club of Sanctuary" was awarded to a table tennis club in Brighton.

In 2016 the first "Theatre Company of Sanctuary" was awarded to Stand Up and Be Counted.

In 2017 the first "Festival of Sanctuary" was awarded to Journeys Festival.

In 2021 the first "Art Gallery of Sanctuary" was awarded to Glynn Vivian gallery in Swansea.

In 2022 the first "Station of Sanctuary" was awarded to Bradford Interchange.

Birmingham Declaration
At the Sanctuary Summit in 2014, people from across the UK refugee sector came together to sign an promote the Birmingham Declaration. Please see below for the full declaration.

This declaration has been signed by over 250 different organisations.

Sanctuary in Parliament
From 2014 - 2018, City of Sanctuary has hosted an event in parliament with the help of the All-Party Parliamentary Group on Refugees. This was an event which invited refugees and asylum seekers from across the UK to meet with their MP and to let their voices be heard in Westminster. The themes of the sessions were related to the biggest issues in the asylum system that year.

References

2005 establishments in the United Kingdom
Charities based in the United Kingdom